Jalan Bani Bu Hassan is a wilayah (province) in Ash Sharqiyah South Governorate, Oman.

Geography 
Jalan Bani Bu Hassan is about 300 kilometres away from Muscat. It is bordered by Al Kamil Wal Wafi in the north, Jalan Bani Bu Ali in the south, Sur in the east, and Bidiya and Sharqiya Sands in the west. The province covers an area of 12,130 km².

Some villages of the province are known for their plains, mountains, caves, and wells, such as the caves of Qihwan Mountain (Qihwan is the local name for the Arabian tahr, which lives in the mountain).

Jalan Bani Bu Hassan town
The town is surrounded by the Wahiba Sands from the west and the high eastern Al Hajar Mountains from the East while the town itself lies on a plain full of desert vegetation and human-grown date palm trees in addition to other local crops.

Population 
According to the National Centre for Statistics & Information:

See  also
 List of cities in Oman

References

Provinces of Oman
Ash Sharqiyah South Governorate